Manuel Ortiz (20 May 1948 – 10 February 2008) was a Cuban fencer. He competed in the individual and team sabre events at four Olympic Games between 1968 and 1980.

References

1948 births
2008 deaths
Cuban male fencers
Olympic fencers of Cuba
Fencers at the 1968 Summer Olympics
Fencers at the 1972 Summer Olympics
Fencers at the 1976 Summer Olympics
Fencers at the 1980 Summer Olympics
Sportspeople from Havana
Pan American Games medalists in fencing
Pan American Games gold medalists for Cuba
Pan American Games silver medalists for Cuba
Fencers at the 1971 Pan American Games
Fencers at the 1975 Pan American Games
Fencers at the 1979 Pan American Games
Fencers at the 1983 Pan American Games
20th-century Cuban people
21st-century Cuban people